Destruction '10 was a professional wrestling pay-per-view (PPV) event promoted by New Japan Pro-Wrestling (NJPW). The event took place on October 11, 2010, in Tokyo, at Ryōgoku Kokugikan. The event featured nine matches, two of which were contested for championships. DDT Pro-Wrestling representatives Kenny Omega and Kota Ibushi and Pro Wrestling Noah representatives Atsushi Aoki and Go Shiozaki worked the event as outsiders. It was the fourth event under the Destruction name.

Storylines
Destruction '10 featured nine professional wrestling matches that involved different wrestlers from pre-existing scripted feuds and storylines. Wrestlers portrayed villains, heroes, or less distinguishable characters in the scripted events that built tension and culminated in a wrestling match or series of matches.

Event
During the event, Kenny Omega and Kota Ibushi captured the IWGP Junior Heavyweight Tag Team Championship from Apollo 55 (Prince Devitt and Ryusuke Taguchi) in the first title switch of the event. In the main event, 2010 G1 Climax winner and freelancer Satoshi Kojima defeated Togi Makabe to win the IWGP Heavyweight Championship for the second time.

Reception
The IWGP Junior Heavyweight Tag Team Championship match was later named the 2010 Match of the Year by Tokyo Sports.

Results

References

External links
The official New Japan Pro-Wrestling website

2010
2010 in professional wrestling
Events in Tokyo
October 2010 events in Japan
Professional wrestling in Tokyo